The Binh Quoi Tourist Village (Làng Du Lịch Bình Quới in Vietnamese) is a tourist attraction in the Bình Thạnh District of Ho Chi Minh City, in southern Vietnam.

The Tourist Village comprises the two parts of the Bình Quới Tourist Area. The Bình Quới Tourist Area I was established by the Vietnamese government in 1975 and 1976, while the Bình Quới Tourist Area II was built from 1979 to 1980, and the Tourist Village was established in 1994. The Tourist Village is located on the Thanh Da peninsula on the Saigon River approximately 8 km (a 20- to 30-minute drive depending on traffic) from the city center.

The Tourist Village is set on lush garden-like grounds with lawns, coconut trees, creeks, and thatched cottages, presenting a view of days gone by in Vietnam's Mekong Delta region. Rich traditional southern Vietnamese cuisine is served there, and the area features a three-level, 700-seat floating restaurant in Bạch Đằng Harbor.

Entertainment includes a cultural show featuring a traditional Vietnamese wedding, complete with water-borne bridal procession, rituals, and dances.

References

External links
Information about Bình Quới 

Tourist attractions in Ho Chi Minh City
1994 establishments in Vietnam
Buildings and structures in Ho Chi Minh City
Holiday villages